The International Bowl is a high school football game held each January in Arlington, Texas at AT&T Stadium. It features USA Football and the American football governing bodies of international countries. The series of games pit the US National Football Team against teams from other countries and regions around the world.

The game began as a tournament in 2009 featuring the United States, Canada, Mexico and France before moving to a single game in a USA vs. The World format. In 2017, the event was expanded from one game to several games over multiple days and features teams of several ages from U19 to U15. 

The game has been broadcast on NFL Network, CBS Sports and ESPN. The United States won the first five meetings against Canada, Mexico, France and the World Team. The World Team was the first to defeat Team USA, with a 35–29 win in the 2012 International Bowl.

Participating Teams

Results
 Winning team in bold
 Tie game denoted in italics

2009

USA vs. The World

2017

2018

2019

2020

Notable participants
Todd Gurley – Los Angeles Rams, college football player at Georgia.
Tyrann Mathieu - Chiefs, SEC Defensive Player of the Year (2011)
Jameis Winston – Buccaneers, college football player at Florida State and Heisman Trophy winner. 
Eno Benjamin - Arizona State: During his sophomore season in 2018, he broke the school record for rushing yards in a game with 312.
Laviska Shenault Jr. - Colorado: First-team All-Pac-12 (2018)
D'Andre Swift – Georgia: Second-Team All-SEC (2018)
Ben Brown - Ole Miss: 2018 SEC All-Freshman Team
Stephon Tuitt - Steelers, Second-team AP All-American (2012)
Malcom Brown - Saints, Second Team All-Big 12 (2014)
Jordan Poyer - Bills, First-team All-Pac-12 (2012)
Devin Funchess - Colts, 2× Second-team All-Big Ten (2013, 2014)
Taylor Rapp - Rams, 2× First-team All-Pac-12 (2017, 2018)
Dalton Risner - Broncos, 3× First-team All-Big 12 (2016, 2017, 2018)
Dwayne Haskins Jr. - Redskins, Big Ten Player of the Year (2018)
N'Keal Harry - Patriots, 2× First-team All-Pac-12 (2017, 2018)
Mecole Hardman - Chiefs, 2× All-SEC Second Team (2017, 2018)
Vosean Joseph - Bills, 2018 Peach Bowl
Justin Jackson - Chargers, Jackson became the leading rusher in Northwestern history and became the ninth player in NCAA history to have four years with 1,000 yards.
Isaiah Wynn - Patriots, Super Bowl champion
Shaquem Griffin - Seahawks, AAC Defensive Player of the Year
Samaje Perine - Bengals, Big 12 Offensive Freshman of the Year (2014)
Jourdan Lewis - Cowboys, Big Ten Defensive Back of the Year (2016)
Ty Montgomery - Jets, First-team All-Pac-12 (2013)
Harrison Phillips - Bills, First-team All-Pac-12 (2017)
Wyatt Teller - Browns, First team All-ACC (2017)
Ethan Pocic - Seahawks First-team All-SEC (2016)
Aaron Dobson – college football player at Marshall
Jacob Ruby – college football player for Richmond Spiders and CFL Edmonton Eskimos

References 

High school football games in the United States